Lucas Township may refer to one of the following townships in the United States:

 Lucas Township, Crittenden County, Arkansas
 Lucas Township, Effingham County, Illinois
 Lucas Township, Lyon County, Minnesota

See also
Lucas (disambiguation)

Township name disambiguation pages